is a passenger railway station located in Nishi-ku, Kobe, Hyōgo Prefecture, Japan, operated by the private Kobe Electric Railway (Shintetsu).

Lines

Station layout
The station consists of two unnumbered ground-level side platforms connected to the station building by a level crossing. The station is unattended.

Platforms

Adjacent stations

History
Kobata Station opened on June 15, 1937.  It was renamed  on October 1, 1952 but reverted to its original name on April 1, 1988.

Passenger statistics
In fiscal 2019, the station was used by an average of 374 passengers daily.

Surrounding area
 Akihadai residential area

See also
List of railway stations in Japan

References

External links

 Official website (Kobe Electric Railway) 

Railway stations in Japan opened in 1937
Railway stations in Kobe